Since Emmanuel Macron was elected President of France on 7 May 2017, a series of protests have been conducted by trade union activists, left-wing activists and right-wing activists in opposition to what protesters consider to be neoliberal policies and globalism, his support of state visits by certain world leaders, his positions on French labour law reform, as well as various comments or policy proposals he has made since assuming the presidency.

According to Amnesty International, French authorities have used the state of emergency, which was in effect from the November 2015 Paris attacks until November 2017, to suppress protests, employing their emergency powers. They "imposed 639 measures preventing specific individuals participating in public assemblies. Of these, 574 were targeted at those protesting against proposed labour law reforms".

Post-election 
On 8 May 2017, only a few hours after Macron was announced the winner of the 2017 French presidential election, union protesters began clashing with French authorities in Paris under fears that Macron's economic program would take away workers’ rights. The protest was organised by "Social Front", which had already staged protests before the second round to protest the two frontrunners, Marine Le Pen and Emmanuel Macron. One specific protest organized by the Social Front had 950 to 1,500 protesters with individuals trying to occupy publicly owned buildings like a railway station in Rennes. Nearly 150 protesters were arrested after reports of missiles being thrown at the police and mass vandalism being done.

The 8 May protest was supported by the CGT and SUD unions.

Protests

2017 

After Macron was inaugurated on 15 May 2017, there were numerous warnings from Labour unions about the prospect of a large organized protest. The CGT Union has attempted numerous times to organise a large-scale demonstration against Macron with one taking place on 12 September 2017. Macron has actively tried to prevent this by opening Labor code reform negotiations with trade unions. The reception among the unions has been mixed with the head of the FO union supporting the negotiations, the CFDT deciding to stay neutral, not participating in the 12 September protests and the CGT denouncing the negotiations alongside its ally SUD. Jean-Luc Mélenchon from La France Insoumise has spoken in support of the 12 September protest encouraging members to attend. Mélenchon himself organized a protest on 12 July 2017.

US President Donald Trump's state visit to France during Bastile Day was met with protests, protesters gathered around Place de la République to create a "No Trump Zone". Protesters were reportedly protesting about the Trump visit and Macron's policies; with the ranks of the protesters being made up of socialists, pro-Palestinian groups, migrants’ rights activists, environmentalists and anti-fascists. Despite mass protests, 59% of French people approve of Trump's visit.

Following Prime Minister Édouard Philippe's announcement of the plans for immigration reform, a small protest was led by a group of LGBT activists in Paris holding up a sign reading "Macron starves migrants, queers without borders"

A series of protests by wine producers in the South of France have been ongoing since François Hollande's presidency. These demonstrations generally involve arson, sabotage and assault. These protests are caused by the importation of wine rather than buying it from French producers and the loss of culture. These protests have led to a 25% decrease in sales for Spanish wine producers. Spanish tankers transporting wine are usually the target of these attacks.

Pro-Palestinian protesters began to demonstrate against Macron offering Israel Prime Minister Netanyahu a place at the Paris Holocaust Ceremony. The French Communist Party also opposed Netanyahu's visit. The organizers of the protest were unknown but Le Muslim Post, a religious radioshow promoted the demonstration, encouraging listeners to attend.

23 March 2018 
200,000 rallied against Macron nationwide.

19 April 2018 
Tens of thousands of striking rail workers, public sector staff and students rallied across France against President Emmanuel Macron. The SNCF and CGT were the major unions in the protests against plans by Macron to remove job-for-life guarantees and pension privileges for new recruits.

13 May 2018 
Transport workers continued to protest against rampant privatisation efforts in France. Key SNCF services were reduced on Sunday.

26 May 2018
A day after the Emmanuel Macron "suggested he could be close to victory in a public battle over his reform agenda," several thousands people across France, led by CGT trade union and some 80 other organizations protested against Macron's reforms of the public sector, described by the organizers as imbalanced and "brutal." According to CGT 80,000 people participated in the protest in Paris, and 250,000 came out across the country. However, France Police said that 21,000 people participated in the Paris protests and that 35 protesters were detained for various "offences". Police fired tear gas and deployed 2000 officers to the event and the demonstrators were holding placards reading "Stop Macron!".

Yellow Vests protests 

In October 2018, Macron announced that the carbon tax would rise in 2019. This was seen as a move crippling the rural class who had no other choice than to use the car and could not afford more expensive fuel. On 17 November 2018, protests occurred in most major cities, and highways were blocked. Protests started again next Saturday and are still occurring on every Saturday as of June 2019. This movement is noticed for having no official leader and its independence, in spite of appropriation attempts by the France Insoumise (Unsubmitted France) and the Rassemblement National (National Rally) parties.

5 December 2019 

A general strike to protest changes to France's pension system proposed by French President Emmanuel Macron. More than 800,000 people protested across the country.

Protests 2020–2021 

Thousands of protesters marched peacefully in a small group against the legislative bill that will criminalise the publish & circulation of the photograph of police office, which the opponent says would limit the press freedom. The protest is also organised to show the anger over the footage where a music producer  a black man, being beaten by three police officers in Paris on November 21, 2020. Some small group of masked protesters dressed in black, burnt down two cars, a motorcycle and a cafe and smashed the windows of the local shops. In response police fired tear gases and stun grenades to disperse the crowd. They also used fired water cannon. The interior ministry said that 46,000 protesters participated in the protest in Paris and nine were arrested.

COVID-19 protests 

Numerous protests took place in 2021 following the introduction of health passes to enter certain public venues during the COVID-19 pandemic. The measures were introduced by Macron's government to increase uptake of COVID-19 vaccination in France.

2022 French presidential election protests 

On April 16, after Macron's victory in the first round of presidential voting, left wing demonstrators clashed with police. French security forces fired tear gas as the anti right-wing demonstrators marched, before allowing the protests to resume.
On April 24, after Macron's victory in the second round of presidential voting, protests broke out in many departments. In the area of Châtelet, riot police charged and sprayed tear gas on demonstrators. Students protested outside of the Sorbonne, expressing their disillusionment of the lack of choice in second round voting.

Autumn 2022 protests 

On October 16, 2022, tens of thousands marched in Paris in protests of rising cost of living at an inflation rate of more than 6%. Concomitantly there have been labor strikes at oil refineries and nuclear plants causing gas shortages.

19 January 2023

A day of strikes and demonstrations took place throughout France against the government's pension reform project, which proposes to raise the retirement age to 64.}

See also 
El Khomri law

References

2017 protests
2018 protests
2019 protests
2020 protests
2021 protests
2022 protests
2023 protests
2017 in French politics
2018 in French politics
2019 in French politics
2020 in French politics
2021 in French politics
2022 in French politics
2023 in French politics
Protests against results of elections
Protests against police brutality
Protests in the European Union
Protests in France
Attacks on buildings and structures in France
Emmanuel Macron